The Altenau is a small river of Lower Saxony, Germany.

Altenau valley 
Between the heights of the Asse and the Heeseberg in the south and the Elm ridge in the north stretches an almost treeless arable plain, the roughly 25 kilometre long  Schöppenstedt Depression (Schöppenstedter Mulde). Here the Altenau flows in an east-west direction in a meadow valley about 500 metres wide. The source of the river lies immediately west of the watershed between the rivers Weser and Elbe. In the southern part of the depression the Altenau picks up a succession of small streams from the slopes of the Elm as it cuts through the hollow as a regulated and relatively straight stream.

See also
List of rivers of Lower Saxony

References

External links 
Altenau valley 
TU Berlin Project Altenau 
Excursions 

Rivers of Lower Saxony
Wolfenbüttel (district)
Elm (hills)
Rivers of Germany